Chet is a studio album by American guitarist Chet Atkins, released in 1967.

Reissues
 Chet was reissued on CD in 2006 combined with Music From Nashville, My Home Town.

Track listing

Side one
 "Foggy Mountain Top" (Carter)
 "Truck Driver's Blues" (Ted Daffan)
 "Bandera" (Atkins)
 "Make the World Go Away" (Hank Cochran)
 "Oh Baby Mine" (Pat Ballard)

Side two
 "Oklahoma Hills" (Woody Guthrie)
 "Just Out of Reach (Stewart)
 "Wabash Cannonball" (Carter)
 "Release Me" (Eddie Miller, W. S. Stevenson)
 "Goin' Down the Road Feelin' Bad" (Traditional)

Personnel
Chet Atkins – guitar

References

1967 albums
Chet Atkins albums
Albums produced by Chet Atkins
Albums produced by Bob Ferguson (music)
RCA Records albums